The  was an annual road running competition over the half marathon distance  which took place each July in Sapporo, Japan.

First held in 1958, the race began as a full marathon competition for men under the moniker of the Hokkai Times Marathon. This lasted until 1973, as it was replaced with a shorter race of 30 km in 1974 and became known as the Times 30K. A women's programme was introduced in 1981, at which point the men's 30 km race was complemented with a women's 20 km. The women's race was slightly extend to the half marathon distance in 1986 and the men's race followed suit the following year. The road racing competition was known as the Sapporo Half Marathon from 1990 onwards.

The race had a strictly looped course in the city of Sapporo which doubled back on itself, having Maruyama Stadium as the start and end point. The competition was broadcast live on national television each year via Nihon TV. The course was certified by AIMS and the Japanese Association of Athletics Federations.Race Summary . Sapporo Television Broadcasting. Retrieved on 2010-07-23. The competition doubled up to act as the national selection race for the 2010 IAAF World Half Marathon Championships.

The Japanese Olympic marathon champion Mizuki Noguchi set a women's course record of 1:08:14 in 2006. Kenya's Mekubo Mogusu is the only runner to finish the course in under an hour, with his men's course record set in 2007 standing at 59 minutes and 54 seconds. Four athletes won the race on three separate occasions: Mogusu, Stephen Mayaka and Juma Ikangaa on the men's side, and Catherine Ndereba on the women's side.

Following the withdrawal of support from its traditional broadcaster, the race ceased to be held after the 2012 edition. On 16 October 2019, the International Olympic Committee announced plans to re-locate the marathon and racewalking events of the Tokyo-based 2020 Summer Olympics to Sapporo due to heat concerns. The plans were made official on 1 November 2019 after Tokyo Governor Yuriko Koike accepted the IOC's decision, despite her belief that the events should have remained in Tokyo.

Past winners

Key:

Distances:

References

List of winners
Winner list . Sapporo Television Broadcasting. Retrieved on 2010-07-23.

External links
Race website at Sapporo Television Broadcasting

Half marathons
Road running competitions in Japan
Recurring sporting events established in 1958
Sports competitions in Sapporo
Tourist attractions in Sapporo
Defunct athletics competitions
1958 establishments in Japan
Defunct sports competitions in Japan
Recurring sporting events disestablished in 2012